Herbert Park is the name of a road and a public park in Ballsbridge, Dublin.

History
The land used for the park was given to the city by the 14th Earl of Pembroke whose family name was Herbert. In 1907, the World Fair known as the Irish International Exhibition was held in Ballsbridge. When the structures had been dismantled, the site was developed as the current public park, with the bandstand and pond being the only remaining structures from the time.  It is now maintained by Dublin City Council. The former site of the Johnston, Mooney & O'Brien bakery bordered the park and when that site was redeveloped as the Herbert Park Hotel, a new entrance was opened at the easternmost end of the park.

The park bandstand was featured in the video for Phil Lynott's song Old Town.

Amenities

The park is thirty-two acres in size and is in two halves, divided by a road, also called Herbert Park.  A full circuit of the park's perimeter is almost exactly one mile (1.57 km), a fact used by runners and walkers to measure their progress.  The larger half, on the south side of the road, is bounded by the River Dodder, houses, and includes a number of soccer pitches, formal gardens, and a large duck pond and an older public children's playground. A gazebo is also present in the North-Eastern corner of the park at the entrance to the Herbert Park Hotel.

The northern half is home to the newly refurbished public children's playground, a number of tennis courts, and the bowling green of Herbert Park Bowling Club.

The park's pond has proven to be an excellent location for breeding carp. In February 2006 the pond was nearly completely 

emptied in order for cleaning to take place. The carp were removed to alternative locations. In spring 2009, the pond was re-stocked (see picture).

See also
List of streets and squares in Dublin

References

Streets in Dublin (city)
Ballsbridge
Parks in Dublin (city)
World's fair sites in Ireland